Pedro Delgado is a paralympic athlete from Spain competing mainly in category T11 400m to 1500m events.

Pedro's first Paralympics was in 1996 where as well as competing in the 1500m he won a bronze medal over 800m.  At his second games in 2000 he competed in the individual 400m before winning a silver as part of the Spanish 4 × 400 m relay team as well as a bronze in the 1500m.  He made a final games in 2004 when competing in the 400m and 1500m but failed to add to his medal tally.

References

Paralympic athletes of Spain
Athletes (track and field) at the 1996 Summer Paralympics
Athletes (track and field) at the 2000 Summer Paralympics
Athletes (track and field) at the 2004 Summer Paralympics
Paralympic silver medalists for Spain
Paralympic bronze medalists for Spain
Living people
Paralympic athletes with a vision impairment
Medalists at the 1996 Summer Paralympics
Medalists at the 2000 Summer Paralympics
Year of birth missing (living people)
Paralympic medalists in athletics (track and field)
Spanish male middle-distance runners
Visually impaired middle-distance runners
Paralympic middle-distance runners
20th-century Spanish people
21st-century Spanish people
Spanish blind people